Charles Ulrich, Jr. (December 14, 1929 – April 10, 2006) was a professional American football defensive tackle in the National Football League. He played five seasons for the Chicago Cardinals (1954–1958).

Ulrich was a member of the Illinois football team that defeated Stanford 40-7 in the 1952 Rose Bowl to stake a claim for the national championship. He attended Fenger High School in Chicago.
 
After his football career, Ulrich was a physical education teacher at Joseph Warren Elementary School in Chicago during the 1960s.

He is a member of the Chicagoland Sports Hall of Fame.

1929 births
2006 deaths
Players of American football from Chicago
American football defensive tackles
Illinois Fighting Illini football players
Chicago Cardinals players